Louis Edmund Larsen (10 January 1874 – 26 May 1950) was a Danish gymnast who competed in the 1906 Intercalated Games.

In 1906 he won the silver medal as member of the Danish gymnastics team in the team competition.

References

External links
profile

1874 births
1950 deaths
Danish male artistic gymnasts
Gymnasts at the 1906 Intercalated Games
Olympic gymnasts of Denmark
Medalists at the 1906 Intercalated Games
Olympic silver medalists for Denmark